Muqadar Qazizadah (born 11 September 1988) is an Afghan footballer who currently plays for Shaheen Asmayee F.C. Until 2011, Qazizadh plays for Kabul Bank F.C. football club. He is also Afghanistan national football team player. He wears number 2 and plays right back position.

Honours
Shaheen Asmayee F.C.
 Afghan Premier League: 2
 2013
 2014
Afghanistan
 2013 SAFF Championship

References

External links

1988 births
Living people
Afghan footballers
Afghanistan international footballers
Shaheen Asmayee F.C. players
Association football defenders